Leucochitonea amneris is a butterfly in the family Hesperiidae. It is found in Tanzania, from Mount Kilimanjaro to Njombe and Tabora.

References

Endemic fauna of Tanzania
Butterflies described in 1894
Tagiadini
Butterflies of Africa